Events of 2019 in Colombia.

Incumbents 
 President: Iván Duque Márquez
 Vice President: Marta Lucia Ramirez

Events

January 
Blacks and Whites' Carnival
2019 Bogotá car bombing: A vehicle-bound suicide bomb attack in Bogotá, Colombia, kills 22 people and injures 68 others, making it the deadliest attack on the Colombian capital since 2003.

February 
2019 Tour Colombia
2019 shipping of humanitarian aid to Venezuela

March 
Barranquilla's Carnival
Cartagena Film Festival
 March 30: A 14-year old "hit man" is arrested in Medellin after killing victims #11 and #12 in cold blood. The victims were businessman Darío Alexis, 42, and a messenger, Mateo C, 20.

July 

 28 July – 22-year-old cyclist Egan Bernal won the 2019 Tour de France.

August

September

October

November

December

Births

Deaths

August
 August 13 – Cecilia Caballero Blanco, socialite and First Lady of Colombia (b. 1913)

September
 September 3 – José de Jesús Pimiento Rodríguez, Roman Catholic cardinal (b. 1919)

See also
 	

 		
 2019 Pan American Games

References 

 
Colombia
2010s in Colombia
Years of the 21st century in Colombia
Colombia